Halil Sami Bey (1866 – 1925) was an Ottoman Army colonel, who served in the First World War. He successfully managed to fend off British forces during the Landing at Cape Helles.

Career 

Halil Sami was in charge of the Ottoman 9th Division on the morning of 25 April 1915 known as The First Battle of Krithia. He was responsible for a very difficult section of the peninsula. His division faced the British 29th Division landing on 5 individual beaches with an initial force of 6 infantry battalions and 2 infantry regiments. The total force on the beaches were the 6th Company defending Sarıtepe Altı and İkiz Koyu, 12th, 10th, 9th and 11th Companies defending Teke koyu and Ertuğrul koyu with a platoon defending the Zığındere (Gully Ravine). The 10th Company, with the heroic efforts of Yahya Çavuş who fought against 3000 British infantry with one squad under his command, was totally wiped out with all the other Turkish forces defending the beaches.

After the 25th, the battle turned into continuous trench warfare with the British and French forces not being able to reach Altçıtepe, a crucial hill which would open the way to the capturing of the peninsula from the south. The Kirte and Zigindere battles inflicted heavy casualties on both sides.

Colonel Halil Sami did not die at Gallipoli. The memorials in Gallipoli accidentally state that he was killed in action but this is not true. There is not much information on what happened to him after the war but he probably got a commission in the Turkish army during the Turkish War of Independence.

He later quarreled with General Otto Liman von Sanders about the war plans. He was taken off the duty on 10 July 1915 and forced to retire from the army.

References 

1866 births
1925 deaths
Ottoman Military Academy alumni
Ottoman Army officers
Ottoman military personnel of the Balkan Wars
Ottoman military personnel of World War I